

Lago, which means "lake" in Italian, Portuguese, Spanish and Galician, may refer to:

Places
Lago, Calabria, a comune in the Province of Cosenza, Italy
Lago, Mexico, a municipality zone in the State of Mexico
Lago District, a distrito in Niassa Province, Mozambique
Lago, Portugal, a freguesia in the District of Braga
Lago, Asturias, a parroquia in the municipio of Allande, Spain
Lago, Texas, a census-designated place

People
Anders Lago, Swedish politician
Ângela Lago (1945–2017), Brazilian children's writer and illustrator
Antonio Lago, Venice-born French motor vehicle manufacturer 
Fábio Lago, Brazilian actor
Nais Lago, Italian  actress
Virginia Lago (born 1946), Argentine actress

Other uses
Lago (Madrid Metro), a station on Line 5
Talbot-Lago, a type of car
Lago, a fictional western town depicted in the film, High Plains Drifter

See also
 Lagos (disambiguation)
 del Lago (disambiguation), including "de Lago"